North Lakeport is a census-designated place (CDP) in Lake County, California, United States. The population was 3,314 at the 2010 census, up from 2,879 at the 2000 census.

Geography

Demographics

2010
At the 2010 census North Lakeport had a population of 3,314. The racial makeup of North Lakeport was 2,685 (81.0%) White, 28 (0.8%) African American, 126 (3.8%) Native American, 40 (1.2%) Asian, 4 (0.1%) Pacific Islander, 271 (8.2%) from other races, and 160 (4.8%) from two or more races. Hispanic or Latino of any race were 571 people (17.2%).

The whole population lived in households, no one lived in non-institutionalized group quarters and no one was institutionalized.

There were 1,414 households, 377 (26.7%) had children under the age of 18 living in them, 631 (44.6%) were opposite-sex married couples living together, 169 (12.0%) had a female householder with no husband present, 72 (5.1%) had a male householder with no wife present.  There were 116 (8.2%) unmarried opposite-sex partnerships, and 10 (0.7%) same-sex married couples or partnerships. 436 households (30.8%) were one person and 198 (14.0%) had someone living alone who was 65 or older. The average household size was 2.34.  There were 872 families (61.7% of households); the average family size was 2.92.

The age distribution was 717 people (21.6%) under the age of 18, 263 people (7.9%) aged 18 to 24, 697 people (21.0%) aged 25 to 44, 961 people (29.0%) aged 45 to 64, and 676 people (20.4%) who were 65 or older.  The median age was 44.5 years. For every 100 females, there were 96.1 males.  For every 100 females age 18 and over, there were 91.5 males.

There were 1,759 housing units at an average density of 268.5 per square mile, of the occupied units 952 (67.3%) were owner-occupied and 462 (32.7%) were rented. The homeowner vacancy rate was 4.6%; the rental vacancy rate was 11.7%.  2,183 people (65.9% of the population) lived in owner-occupied housing units and 1,131 people (34.1%) lived in rental housing units.

2000
At the 2000 census there were 2,879 people, 1,205 households, and 765 families in the CDP. The racial makeup of the CDP was 88.75% White, 1.15% African American, 2.08% Native American, 0.42% Asian, 0.14% Pacific Islander, 4.90% from other races, and 2.57% from two or more races. Hispanic or Latino of any race were 13.20%.

Of the 1,205 households 27.6% had children under the age of 18 living with them, 48.0% were married couples living together, 10.6% had a female householder with no husband present, and 36.5% were non-families. 29.5% of households were one person and 12.4% were one person aged 65 or older.  The average household size was 2.35 and the average family size was 2.89.

The age distribution was 24.3% under the age of 18, 6.3% from 18 to 24, 23.0% from 25 to 44, 26.4% from 45 to 64, and 20.0% 65 or older.  The median age was 42 years. For every 100 females, there were 98.4 males.  For every 100 females age 18 and over, there were 95.3 males.

The median household income was $34,155 and the median family income  was $41,716. Males had a median income of $38,750 versus $29,181 for females. The per capita income for the CDP was $18,410.  About 8.2% of families and 10.5% of the population were below the poverty line, including 13.8% of those under age 18 and 5.7% of those age 65 or over.

Government

References

External links
 Information webpage on Lakeport, California

Census-designated places in Lake County, California
Lakeport, California
Census-designated places in California